Whitewater Canyon may refer to:

Geography
 Whitewater Canyon on the Whitewater River in Southern California
 Whitewater Canyon on the Whitewater Creek in New Mexico
 Whitewater Canyon National Forest Recreation Area, in New Mexico
 Whitewater Canyon Park in Jones and Dubuque County, Iowa

See also
 White Water Canyon, a Canadian theme park ride
 White Water Canyon, a themed area at Canada's Wonderland theme park
 Whitewater (disambiguation)
 Whitewater River (disambiguation)